Victoria Teresa DiMartino (born September 4, 1991) is an American former soccer player from Massapequa, New York. She was a forward for the Western New York Flash in the National Women's Soccer League, and  a defender for the United States U-20 women's national soccer team.

Early life
DiMartino grew up in Massapequa, New York and attended Massapequa High School where she was a 2009 Parade All-American. During her three seasons at Massapequa, she scored 52 goals and provided 27 assists. She was named All-County as a freshman, sophomore and junior. In 2007, she was named an NSCAA Youth All-American. As a junior, she earned All-Long Island and Big Apple Player of the Year honors. She played in three games as a senior due to national team commitments.

As a teenager, she played for club team, the Alberston Fury. She won the New York State Cup every year she played in the tournament.

Boston College
DiMartino attended Boston College and played for the Eagles for four years. She finished her career at Boston as the third all-time in points scored with 93 career points. She finished third on the goals scored list with 34 and fifth in assists with 25.

Playing career

Club
In 2013, DiMartino was drafted to the Western New York Flash in the National Women's Soccer League. She was selected seventh in the third round during the 2013 NWSL College Draft.

International
DiMartino has represented the United States on the U-15, U-16, U-17, U-20, and U-23 national teams. A multi-dimensional player, she played as forward for the U-17 team, as outside back and outside midfield for the U.S. U-20 team and also played forward at the U-20 World Cup. She is a member of the U.S. team that won the 2010 CONACAF U-20 Women's Championships in Guatemala to earn a berth to the 2010 FIFA U-20 Women's World Cup.

DiMartino was one of the leading scorers for the U-17 team in 2008. She scored five goals in five consecutive games (the only U.S. player ever to achieve that feat in a World Cup) and won the Silver Boot as the second-leading scorer  at the U-17 Women's World Cup in New Zealand. She scored twice at the CONCACAF U-17 Women's Qualifying Tournament. She finished her U-17 international career with nine goals in 14 matches.

Personal
DiMartino has two older sisters who played professional soccer. Her oldest sister Christina DiMartino, a former star at UCLA, was a midfielder for the United States women's national soccer team and Philadelphia Independence. Another sister, Gina DiMartino, was a forward for the Philadelphia Independence.

References

External links
 
 Boston College player profile
 US Soccer player profile

1991 births
Living people
Boston College Eagles women's soccer players
National Women's Soccer League players
Western New York Flash players
People from Massapequa, New York
American women's soccer players
Women's association football defenders
Women's association football forwards
Western New York Flash draft picks
United States women's under-20 international soccer players
Massapequa High School alumni